is an action-adventure game developed by Human Entertainment and released for the PlayStation in 1995. It is a sequel to The Firemen.

Gameplay 

Similar to the earlier game in the series, The Firemen 2 involves stopping a deadly fire, this time in a theme park on Christmas Eve. The game supports both single-player and co-op play. Players must put out small fires on the ground by spraying them with their hose, which only impede progress. Moving and tall fires can hurt the player and must be put out with a standard spray. A water bomb gives off a spray of water and puts out all fires in the vicinity.

Levels have a different outcome depending on whether the player is able to save people trapped in the fire. Victims appear on the radar and the player must attempt to reach them in time.

Plot 
Two firemen, Pete and Danny, are called in to respond to a fire in a high-tech amusement park where the robots have run amok and set fire to it. The robots in the various attractions appear as bosses, such as an animatronic T-Rex.

Release 
Fireman 2 was released in Japan on December 22, 1995 for the Sony PlayStation.

It was not released in the West until it was published by MonkeyPaw Games on January 28, 2014 on PlayStation Network as a digital download for the price of $5.99. However, the game was not localized and still retains its original Japanese voice acting without subtitles.

Reception 
Three reviewers for GameFan gave it a 66, 45, and 70, scores.

Jenni Lada of TechnologyTell rated the game a "B", saying it was a unique experience and praising the inclusion of a co-op mode, but criticizing its stuttering issues.

Conrad Zimmerman of Destructoid said he was "totally smitten" by the premise of "firefighters working together in a cooperative game" and said he wished he knew of its existence when it was released. However, Allistair Pinsof, of the same publication, called the game "lackluster".

Hardcore Gaming 101 called the game "rushed", saying it was "unfinished" and criticizing the removal of gameplay mechanics from the first game.

References 

1995 video games
PlayStation (console) games
PlayStation Network games
Video games about firefighting
Human Entertainment games
Video games developed in Japan
Video games about robots
Video games set in amusement parks
Cooperative video games
Video game sequels
MonkeyPaw Games games
Multiplayer and single-player video games